The Markermeer is a  lake in the central Netherlands in between North Holland, Flevoland, and its smaller and larger neighbors, the IJmeer and IJsselmeer. A shallow lake at 3 to 5 m in depth, matching the reclaimed land to its west, north-west and east it is named after the small former island, now peninsula, of Marken on its west shore.

The Markermeer was not originally intended to remain a lake. It was formerly part of the Zuiderzee, a saltwater inlet of the North Sea, that was dammed off by the Afsluitdijk (Closure Dike) in 1932, turning the Zuiderzee into the freshwater IJsselmeer. The following years saw the reclamation of extensive tracts of land as large polders in an enormous project known as the Zuiderzee Works. One of these, the Markerwaard, was to occupy the area of the current Markermeer. Part of the construction of this polder was building the Houtribdijk, also called Markerwaarddijk, finished in 1976, which hydrologically splits the IJsselmeer in two, the southern section being the Markermeer.

Because of changing priorities and doubts about its financial feasibility, the Markerwaard was indefinitely postponed in the 1980s and the Markermeer has since begun to become an ecological and recreational asset on its own.

The Markermeer is used as a freshwater reservoir and a buffer against floodwaters and droughts. In 2003 the Netherlands was hit by drought, and several minor dikes were endangered. Water from the Markermeer was used to keep the area surrounding Amsterdam wet, thereby keeping the dikes safe.

A recent project, the Marker Wadden aims to create some islands in the north of the lake, with a view to establish breeding grounds for seabirds. The islands will be a wetland, comparable with the Wadden Sea, but without appreciable tides because the Markermeer is not connected with the sea. This new nature reserve will be made accessible to tourists.

See also 
 Zuiderzeemuseum
 IJsselmeer

References

External links 

 Markermeer ENC Chart (fishing marine charts for navigation)
 Rijkswaterstaat:
 Markermeer (in Dutch) with facts, projects, news and daily messages
 Marker Wadden (in English)
 Targets and results of the Houtribdijk - Reinforcement of the Houtribdijk - Videos about the Houtribdijk:
 Houtribdijk reinforcement: Building with Nature (March 2019)
 Reinforcement Houtribdijk with sandy banks: a worldwide first. These are downloadable videos, with information in transcripts.

Lakes of the Netherlands
Landforms of Flevoland
Landforms of North Holland
Buildings and structures completed in 1976
Ramsar sites in the Netherlands